Peter Livingston (born 8 September 1980), known professionally as Loefah, is one of the pioneering founders of dubstep most notable for his releases on one of the genre's founding labels, DMZ. Loefah started off collaborating with the Digital Mystikz on the DMZ nights run in Brixton and was part of Mary Anne Hobbs' Dubstep Warz radio show that contributed to breaking the genre to the mainstream. He was known for having a dark and minimal style that used powerful basslines and menacing vocal samples in order to create a sense of dread.

In around 2007 Loefah began to fall out of love with the genre. In 2009 he founded the record label Swamp 81 which originally released dubstep records by the likes of Kryptic Minds and Skream. However following the release of Addison Groove's "Footcrab" the label began to focus on an increasingly wider spectrum of Bass music. His label holds a regular show on Rinse FM.

Loefah Discography (Singles and EPs)

References

Dubstep musicians
Living people
1980 births